Pizza is an Indian horror film series. The franchise is produced by C. V. Kumar and distributed by Abi & Abi Pictures and Sangam Cinemas. Each film starts with a fresh story unrelated with the preceding film's story. However, the theme and the pace remains the same.

Overview

Pizza

Michael, a pizza delivery boy, lives with Anu, an aspiring horror fiction writer. One day, while delivering food, he goes to a bungalow where mysterious events begin to take place.

Pizza 2

Jebin and his girlfriend Aarthi find a series of paintings in an ancient mansion that highlight Jebin's future. Trouble beckons when the incidents from the paintings begin to come true.

Films

Pizza

The first installment of the series, based on a fictional incidents. The film is written and directed by Karthik Subbaraj and produced by C. V. Kumar. It stars Vijay Sethupathi, Remya Nambeesan in lead roles.Pizza was released on 19 October 2012 by Sangam Cinemas Chennai, in 600 theatres and gained positive response from audiences. It earned ₹8 crore worldwide against a budget of ₹1.5 crore. The satellite rights of the film were acquired by Sun TV.

Pizza 2

After the success of Pizza, C. V. Kumar and Santhosh Narayanan Re-unite once again for sequel. The film was titled as Pizza II: Villa and also second installment in this series. The film stars Ashok Selvan and Sanchita Shetty in lead roles. The film was released on 14 November 2013 worldwide. and gained positive response from audiences. Proving to be similarly successful to the first entry in the series, the film emerged as a huge box office success collected ₹20 crore worldwide.

Pizza 3

On October 15, a teaser was released on Vasy Music Entertainment. The film is titled as Pizza 3: The Mummy and the film is set to release in April 2022.

Recurring cast and characters 
This table lists the main characters who appear in the pizza Franchise.A dark grey cell indicates the character was not in the film.
TBA blue cell indicates the character name not fixed yet in the film.

Additional crew and production details

Release and revenue

References

External links

 

Indian film series
Indian horror thriller films
2010s mystery thriller films
Indian mystery thriller films
2010s Tamil-language films
Films scored by Santhosh Narayanan
Tamil films remade in other languages
Films directed by Karthik Subbaraj